Victory Nunatak is a conspicuous island-like nunatak with three rocky summits, the southernmost and highest rising to 360 meters. It rises above the ice of southeastern Mobiloil Inlet 8 nautical miles (15 km) southeast of Kay Nunatak on the east coast of Antarctic Peninsula. The nunatak was first mapped by W.L.G. Joerg from air photos taken by Lincoln Ellsworth on November 23, 1935. It was subsequently photographed from the air by United States Antarctic Service (USAS) in September 1940, the Falkland Islands Dependencies Survey (FIDS) in August 1947, and the Ronne Antarctic Research Expedition (RARE) (Trimetrogon air photography) in December 1947. It was named by the United Kingdom Antarctic Place-Names Committee (UK-APC) in 1961; when viewed from the air three dots and a dash, Morse code for the letter "V", are apparent on the surface of the feature.

Nunataks of Graham Land
Bowman Coast